Biddlestone Hall was a large country house at Biddlestone in Northumberland.

History
The Georgian style mansion was built for the Selby family about 1796 on the site of an older house, and in about 1820 Walter Selby commissioned architect John Dobson to design various changes to the house including a private family chapel to be incorporated into the Hall. The Selbys left Biddlestone in about 1914 and the Hall deteriorated to such an extent that it was demolished in 1957 leaving only the chapel standing.

References

Robinson, John, Felling the Ancient Oaks, Aurum Press, 2011, 

Country houses in Northumberland
British country houses destroyed in the 20th century
Buildings and structures demolished in 1957
Demolished buildings and structures in England